Harold Joseph  Marker (September 17, 1910 – April 19, 1989) was an American football player at West Virginia University and later with the Pittsburgh Pirates.  He played in the National Football League for the Pirates in just one game in 1934, before deciding on a military career in the United States Army. He, along with Ralph Heywood, have the distinction of being the only players to serve as members of the United States Armed Forces during World War II, the Korean and Vietnam Wars.

References
 

1910 births
1989 deaths
United States Army soldiers
United States Army personnel of World War II
United States Army personnel of the Korean War
Pittsburgh Pirates (football) players
Players of American football from Pennsylvania
West Virginia Mountaineers football players
People from Westmoreland County, Pennsylvania
United States Army personnel of the Vietnam War